The Tonawanda News was a daily newspaper in North Tonawanda, New York, United States, covering part of Niagara County, as well as Tonawanda, the Town of Tonawanda and the Village of Kenmore in Erie County.

It was last owned by Greater Niagara Newspapers, a division of Community Newspaper Holdings Inc.

The newspaper won numerous AP and New York Newspaper Publisher Association awards for its coverage of major stories, including the crash of Flight 3407 in Clarence, N.Y.

The newspaper shut down January 31, 2015 due to financial insolvency.

References

External links
 Tonawanda News Website
 CNHI Website

Daily newspapers published in New York (state)
Niagara County, New York